Exogen may refer to:

 an archaic term meaning a woody plant whose stem is formed by successive accretions to the outside of the wood under the bark; see 
 a phase in the life cycle of a hair follicle in which a hair exits the follicle

See also
 Exogenesis (disambiguation)
 Exogeny